Ojos Negros is an album by Argentine bandoneon player and composer Dino Saluzzi with cellist Anja Lechner recorded in 2006 and released on the ECM label.

Reception
The Allmusic review by Michael G. Nastos awarded the album 4 stars stating "It's not a happy music in the strictest sense, but displays an inward joy not readily discernible. So as a listener, you are required to pay close attention to not only the sounds produced by these two extraordinary musicians, but also to the warmth and slowed beat of your heart".

Track listing
All compositions by Dino Saluzzi 
 "Tango a Mi Padre" - 4:16   
 "Minguito" - 6:56   
 "Esquina" - 8:38   
 "Duetto" - 6:00   
 "Ojos Negros"  - 5:48   
 "El Títere" - 10:15   
 "Carretas" - 6:25   
 "Serenata' - 8:43  
Recorded at Kulturbuehne AmBach in Goetzis, Austria in April 2006

Personnel
Dino Saluzzi — bandoneón
Anja Lechner — cello

References

ECM Records albums
Dino Saluzzi albums
2003 albums
Albums produced by Manfred Eicher